The Diocese of Tampere is the second oldest and the largest diocese in the Evangelical Lutheran Church of Finland. It is divided into 69 parishes with a total population of over 595,000 people. The diocese is led by the Bishop of Tampere.

History
The history of the diocese goes back over 450 years. It was founded in 1554 when King Gustav Vasa divided the diocese of Turku, extending over the whole country, into two parts. At first, the new diocese was established in Viipuri, the first bishop being Paavali Juusteen. After the Russian occupation of Viipuri in 1723, the bishop's seat was moved to Porvoo instead. But with the foundation of a new Swedish Diocese in Porvoo in 1923, the second oldest diocese of Finland had to move to Tampere; since then the diocese has been called the Diocese of Tampere.

The Tampere Cathedral opens everyday but places some limitations on the number of hours it is opened. At the upper part of the cathedral, there is 'The Wounded Angel.' People are not usually allowed to visit the upper part of the cathedral.

The Bishop of Tampere

The Bishop of Tampere is the leader of the Diocese of Tampere. The current bishop is the Rt Revd Matti Repo.

Bishops of Viipuri 
List of bishops of Viipuri from 1554 to 1723:
 Paavali Juusten 1554–1563
 Canutus Johannis 1563–1564
 Eerik Härkäpää 1568–1578
 Olaus Elimaeus 1618–1629
 Nicolaus Magni Carelius 1630–1632
 Gabriel Melartopaeus 1633–1641
 Petrus Bjugg 1642–1656
 Nicolaus Nycopensis 1658–1664
 Petrus Brommius 1664–1672
 Abraham Thauvonius 1672–1679
 Henrik Carstenius 1679–1683
 Petrus Bång 1681–1696
 Petrus Laurbecchius 1696–1705
 David Lund 1705–1711
 Johannes Gezelius the youngest 1721–1723

Bishops of Porvoo 
List of bishops of Porvoo from 1723 to 1923:
 Johannes Gezelius the youngest 1723–1733
 Daniel Juslenius 1734–1743
 Johan Nylander 1745–1761
 Gabriel Fortunius 1762–1789
 Paul Krogius 1789–1792
 Zacharias Cygnaeus 1792–1809
 Magnus Jacob Alopaeus 1809–1818
 Zacharias Cygnaeus the younger 1819–1820
 Johan Molander 1821–1837
 Carl Gustaf Ottelin 1838–1864
 Frans Ludvig Schauman 1865–1878
 Anders Johan Hornborg 1878–1883
 Johan Viktor Johnsson 1884
 Carl Henrik Alopaeus 1885–1892
 Herman Råbergh 1892–1920
 Jaakko Gummerus 1920–1923

Bishops of Tampere 

List of bishops of Tampere from 1923 to the present:
 Jaakko Gummerus 1923–1933
 Aleksi Lehtonen 1934–1945
 Eelis Gulin 1945–1966
 Erkki Kansanaho 1966–1981
 Paavo Kortekangas 1981–1996
 Juha Pihkala 1996–2008
 Matti Repo 2008–

See also
 Tampere Cathedral

History of Vyborg
1554 establishments in Sweden
Religious organizations established in the 1550s
Dioceses established in the 16th century
Tampere

de:Liste der Bischöfe von Tampere